Marko Baša (born 29 December 1982) is a Montenegrin retired professional footballer who played as a centre back.

Club career

Lille
On 23 June 2011, Baša returned to France after three years in Russia with Lokomotiv Moscow, signing a contract with 2010–11 Ligue 1 champions Lille.

He is first choice for centre back. He scored his first goal for Lille against Olympique de Marseille in Trophée des champions. His team lost 4–5.

He scored his first goal in Ligue 1 for Lille on 23 October, against Olympique Lyonnais. His team won 3–1. He scored again in a 3–2 victory over Ajaccio on 3 December.

International career

U21
Baša won Olympic qualification by finishing runner-up at 2004 UEFA European Under-21 Football Championship.

He was part of the Serbia and Montenegro 2004 Olympic football team that exited in the first round, finishing fourth in Group C behind gold-medal winners Argentina, Australia and Tunisia.

Serbia and Montenegro
Baša capped a total of three times for Serbia and Montenegro in 2005. All were friendlies.

In the years after the dissolution of the state union of Serbia and Montenegro, Baša's international loyalty remained unclear. He received a call-up from Serbia national team by head coach Javier Clemente for the away friendly against Czech Republic on 16 August 2006 (first match since Montenegro left the state union) but did not show up - apparently because of an injury. Since then, his international loyalty was often a subject of press speculation, but he did not receive any more official call-ups from Serbia.

Montenegro
In March 2007 he was frequently quoted in Montenegrin press (namely Vijesti daily) saying that he wants to play for Montenegro, but he made himself unavailable for their inaugural match on 24 March 2007 due to, as he said, "objective circumstances". Then, in late May he apparently did not respond to Montenegrin football officials' attempts to get in touch with him and as a result he wasn't included in the team that went to Japan to play in Kirin Cup. Finally, Baša received a call-up from Montenegro for their friendly against Slovenia on 22 August 2007 but did not show up.

Only in February 2009, new information appeared that Baša is considering appearing for Montenegro again if he gets a call up after Montenegro national team coach Zoran Filipović insistence. He received a call-up against Italy in March 2009, and made his debut as starter. He earned a total of 39 caps, scoring 2 goals. His final international was a June 2017 friendly match against Iran.

Personal life
Marko Baša was born in Trstenik, in central Serbia (at the time part of SR Serbia, SFR Yugoslavia).  His father is from Rijeka Crnojevića.

References

External links

 FootballDatabase provides Marko Baša's profile and stats
 arhiva.kurir-info.rs
 
 
 Baša za Srbiju! , Vecernje novosti, 13 March 2007
 Baša ipak Crnogorac , Vecernje novosti, 15 March 2007
 

1982 births
Living people
People from Trstenik, Serbia
Serbian people of Montenegrin descent
Montenegrin people of Serbian descent
Serbian expatriate sportspeople in Montenegro
Association football central defenders
Serbia and Montenegro footballers
Serbia and Montenegro international footballers
Serbia and Montenegro under-21 international footballers
Footballers at the 2004 Summer Olympics
Olympic footballers of Serbia and Montenegro
Montenegrin footballers
Montenegro international footballers
Dual internationalists (football)
OFK Beograd players
FK Proleter Zrenjanin players
Le Mans FC players
FC Lokomotiv Moscow players
Lille OSC players
First League of Serbia and Montenegro players
Ligue 1 players
Russian Premier League players
Montenegrin expatriate footballers
Expatriate footballers in France
Montenegrin expatriate sportspeople in France
Expatriate footballers in Russia
Montenegrin expatriate sportspeople in Russia